HMS Protector was an Antarctic patrol vessel of the Royal Navy between 1955 and 1968. She was built in 1935 as a net laying ship.

Construction and design
Protector was laid down as a fast net layer by Yarrow Shipbuilders at their Scotstoun, Glasgow shipyard on 15 August 1935, launched on 20 August 1936 and was completed in December 1936. She was commissioned on 30 December 1936.

Two Admiralty three-drum boilers fed steam to Parsons geared steam turbines, which drove two propeller shafts. The turbines were replaced in 1945 by British Thompson-Houston geared turbines.

The ship was initially armed with a single QF 4-inch (102 mm) naval gun Mk V gun on a low-angle mounting aft, with this was later replaced by a twin QF 4-inch naval gun Mk XVI anti-aircraft mount, while seven 20 mm Oerlikon cannon were added to provide a close-in anti aircraft defence. The ship had a crew of 190.

Modifications
Protector was modified in 1955 for service as a guardship for the Falkland Islands Dependencies and a survey vessel for Antarctic waters. The twin 4-inch gun mount was moved to a forward position, allowing a flight deck and hangar for a helicopter to be fitted aft, while the close-in armament was reduced to four 20 mm cannon (with four 3-pounder saluting guns also carried). The ship's bridge was enclosed and the hull ice strengthened. A further refit in 1957 saw Protectors bridge remodelled, while in 1958 a tripod mainmast was mounted on the ship's hangar, and a crane was fitted.

Service
Protector was listed as part of the Mediterranean Fleet in February 1939, and remained part of the Mediterranean Fleet in August, on the eve of the outbreak of the Second World War.

Protector served in the South Atlantic and in the Norwegian Campaign during World War II before being hit by an aerial torpedo in the Mediterranean. She was towed to Bombay and repaired before returning to Britain after the end of hostilities.

In 1953, the ship took part in the Fleet Review to celebrate the Coronation of Queen Elizabeth II.

After time in the fleet reserve as a training ship, Protector was refitted as an ice patrol ship in Devonport, with a rudimentary hangar and flight deck for two Westland Whirlwind helicopters. She made her first Antarctic patrol in the winter of 1955/56, serving the Falkland Islands and the British Antarctic Survey bases. She returned to the Antarctic 13 more times in her career.
During her patrols the ship rescued the passengers and crew of the icebound MV Theron, including Sir Edmund Hillary and Dr Vivian Fuchs.

In 1960 Protector was under the command of the Commander in Chief, South Atlantic and South America.

On 6th December 1963 Leading Seaman Reg Hodge and Able Seaman Michael 'Shady' Lane lost their lives whilst prepping a depth charge for seismic research aboard HMS Protector . She was working with RSS John Biscoe South of Drake's Passage at the time. The explosion injured a number of other sailors. They were buried with full naval honours in the cemetery at Stanley. <ref>https://www.antarctic-monument.org/those-who-did-not-return/leading-seaman-hodge}}<ref>

Protector was sold for scrap at Inverkeithing on 10 February 1970.

References

Publications
 
 
 
 

Survey vessels of the Royal Navy
1936 ships
Ships built on the River Clyde
Boom defence vessels of the Royal Navy